Rock Star: Supernova is the second season of the reality television show Rock Star.  The show, hosted by Dave Navarro and Brooke Burke, featured 15 contestants competing to become the lead vocalist for a newly formed supergroup featuring Mötley Crüe drummer Tommy Lee, former Metallica bassist Jason Newsted, and former Guns N' Roses guitarist Gilby Clarke.

On September 13, 2006, Lukas Rossi was crowned the winner and became the frontman of the band Rock Star Supernova.

Controversy
As the show's name implies, the new group was to be called Supernova; however, another band named Supernova was granted an injunction against the television supergroup stating that they cannot use the name "Supernova" for any promotion or perform under that name.  With this judicial ruling, the band announced their official name would be "Rock Star Supernova".

Background
The show began online on the Rock Star web site on MSN on Monday, July 3 with an Internet exclusive weekly episode and premiered on 5 July 2006 on CBS in the United States and Global in Canada. Votes could be cast on the Rock Star website or by text message on Verizon Wireless. it was one of two prominent programs in the "Rock Reality Show" mini movement of the summer of 2006, the other being VH1's Supergroup.

Unlike in the first season, the behind-the-scenes episodes were not televised in the U.S.; instead, they were available online at the official MSN sponsored website, to subscribers of Verizon, and through the Rock Star tab on Windows Live Messenger.  However, these "In the Mansion" reality episodes did air on television in Canada on Global, in Australia on Foxtel channel FOX8, and in Asia on STAR World.

Top 15 finalists
The following is a list of songs performed by each finalist during the competition. They are listed in elimination order, so the first one mentioned was in first place in the competition and the number represents the week in which the song was performed.  Each week one finalist is asked to perform an encore performance of the song they performed the night before which is noted below as an "Encore Performance".  The three finalists who have the lowest total votes for the week are also asked to perform another song of their choice, and this song is noted as a "Bottom Three Performance".  Additionally, beginning in Week Seven, one finalist is chosen to debut a new Supernova song with the members of Supernova.  This is noted below as a "Special Performance".

Lukas Rossi's victory makes him the second Canadian to win the Rock Star competition.

Episodes

Week one

Performance episode All 15 contestants performed cover songs. Most of the rockers were praised for their performances (especially Dilana's version of Lithium and Lukas' version of "Rebel Yell"), but there was one notable bad performance in Chris Pierson's performance of "Roxanne" by The Police. They were judged by Dave Navarro, Tommy Lee, Jason Newsted, Gilby Clarke, and the album's producer Butch Walker.

Elimination episode At the beginning of the episode, Supernova wanted to see an encore of one rocker, which was Dilana. Phil, Chris and Matt were placed in the bottom three based on votes from around the world. Magni, Ryan and Zayra were also in the bottom three at some time during voting. They each performed one cover song of their choosing. Elimination was based on this additional performance and their previous performance. Subsequently, Matt was chosen by the band to be eliminated. Despite praising his previous nights performance of "Yellow" by Coldplay, Supernova claimed that Matt's elimination was based on his song choice; Jason, in particular, had exhorted Matt to "bring the rock" with his selection, and Matt's choice of "Planet Earth" by Duran Duran was seen as not being nearly "rock" enough.

Week two

Performance episode The 14 contestants again performed cover songs. Their judges were the same, with the exception of the album's producer Butch Walker, who was absent. Jill, who performed Violet by Hole was accused by Dave of imitating Courtney Love by wearing a wedding dress as she did for the song's video.

Elimination episode This week, due to his strong performance, Toby was awarded the encore. Zayra, Jill, and Chris found themselves in the bottom three based on the worldwide vote, while Jenny was singled out as the only other contestant to have at some point been in the bottom three during the voting period.  Each one performed the cover song of their choice and based on that performance as well as their previous performances the band chose Chris to be eliminated.  Supernova pointed out the fact that Chris was in the bottom three two weeks in row and cited that as a reason as to why he was eliminated. The next week, both Gilby and Dave said they at first felt they had made a mistake by not eliminating Zayra (they both told her they had changed their opinions of her).

Week three

In The Mansion episode The 13 remaining contestants received lessons from vocal coach Lis Lewis (who has worked with stars, Steve Perry, Rihanna, and Emii). During song selection, an argument arose between Jill and Patrice over the song "Helter Skelter". Josh also frustrated others by taking Nirvana's "Come as You Are" without checking to see if it was all right with the other members.

Performance episode The 13 contestants each performed a cover song. An accompanying note said that on one of the songs, the contestant would be backed by a member of Supernova. This song turned out to be Phil's choice, "White Rabbit" by Jefferson Airplane, and Jason Newsted played bass on his performance. Phil was praised for his performance, Dave especially pointing out how he finally added some intensity. Lukas, Magni, Dilana, Zayra, Patrice, and Jill all earned praise from the judges that night. All the judges said they stood corrected about Zayra, as they all liked her performance.

Elimination episode This week, after Tommy noted the great performances from Dilana and Jill, Magni was awarded this week's encore. Based on the worldwide vote, the three rockers with the fewest votes were Dana, Jenny, and Josh. Zayra and Ryan were also noted as having been in the bottom three at some point during the voting period. These three rockers all performed the cover song of their choice, and in the end, Jenny was eliminated. Supernova said that while her performance was much more rock-oriented than before, they were not sure about her vocals.

Week four

In The Mansion episode The 12 remaining contestants met with Gilby Clarke. He explained to them that for their next clinic they would form into three groups and write lyrics and melodies to go with a song that the Supernova band had already recorded. The team captains were the three who got the encores (Dilana Toby and Magni.) Dilana's team consisted of her, Lukas, Ryan, and Storm. Toby's team consisted of himself, Phil, Patrice, and Zayra. Magni's team consisted of him, Josh, Jill, and Dana. The contestants did so and Supernova, upon hearing all three new songs, were very impressed and declared all three groups winners. Song selection this week was much more civilized than the previous week.

Performance episode The 12 contestants each performed a cover song. An accompanying note said that the contestant that chooses the song "Brown Sugar" will be backed by Gilby Clarke on guitar. Storm Large was highly praised for her performance of Dramarama's "Anything Anything" and did a stage dive after the climax of the song.
There was a standing ovation for her and she made rockstar history as the only person to do a Stagedive.
Jill Gioya Chose to do Brown Sugar backed by Gilby Clarke. Though she was praised by Dave for her performance, Gilby stated that he was annoyed when she started to "GRIND" against him.

Elimination episode The show started with Storm receiving the encore for her performance of Dramarama's "Anything, Anything". Of course, as per the show's format, Brooke immediately soured the mood and announced the three rockers with the fewest votes, who were Patrice, Phil, and Zayra. Josh and Jill were also in the bottom three at some point during the voting period. All three performed the cover songs of their choice. Patrice sang "My Iron Lung" by Radiohead, Zayra sang "Not An Addict" by K's Choice, and Phil sang "Smoking Umbrellas" by Failure. Patrice and Zayra notably got a standing ovation from Supernova. Supernova deliberated and they stated all three of the contestants gave great performances. Despite being complimented by Dave Navarro for his song selection of "Smoking Umbrellas" and Gilby stating it was his best performance, Phil was chosen to be the one sent home due to Supernova being unsure of whether he really wanted to be in the band. Essentially his elimination was due to statements that Phil had made to the press that he was primarily in the competition to get free publicity for himself and his band, and was not "stoked" about the music Supernova was creating; while it was cut from the aired show, live attendees at the taping reported that Dave Navarro read from Phil's hometown newspaper of The Daily Times. On the following days Dave Navarro confirmed the reason's for Phil's exit on his MySpace and personal website's blogs as a "question of his commitment", rehashing the words read aloud from the article. He also commented on Phil's overall performance and the rumors of scandal from this results show. Dave commented that Phil's weekly performances were too similar and he did not seem to heed the advice to change it up, as opposed to Zayra.  Dave also referred to the clip of this actual moment in question viewable on the YouTube website, which also confirms the interactions between Phil, the band, and him on this night.

Week five

In The Mansion episode Many of the remaining contestants were stunned that Phil was sent home as many of them, especially the guys, believed that Zayra should have been sent home. The eleven remaining contestants met with Jason Newsted. He walked the contestants through the art of stage performances, stating Supernova was aware that they could all sing, but wanted to know if they could actually lead the band. Song selection this week was done in a different way, with Lukas bringing all the songs outside and laying them on the table. The contestants liked the idea of not being confined and having the long march to the room where the songs are posted. Patrice received the most stress from this when she chose the song "Higher Ground", knowing that Tommy Lee would be playing on the drums.

Performance Episode The 11 remaining contestants performed their cover songs. Patrice's worries were gone when she was highly praised for the performance of "Higher Ground". Other highly praised performances by the judges were by Dilana, Magni, Ryan, Storm, Dana, Toby and Josh. Zayra received a middle level of praise after the band took more time than usual to collect their thoughts on her performance. The only two contestants to receive negative comments were Jill  for over singing "Don't You Forget About Me" and Lukas for forgetting much of the lyrics to "Celebrity Skin".

Elimination Episode At the beginning of the show, Supernova asked the eleven remaining contestants if they deserved the encore. Only four of the rockers raised their hands, among them Zayra, Storm, Patrice, and a hesitant Ryan. Supernova commented that at this point in the game everyone should have raised their hands for the encore. Supernova noted that it was close in the competition this week with some solid performances, one of them edging the rest out slightly. This night the encore would belong to Ryan, who reprised his performance of the REM classic "Losing My Religion" on piano. The three rockers that were in the bottom three were Jill, Dana and Patrice. Toby and Zayra were also in the bottom three at some point during the voting period. Dave noted surprise that Toby was standing up and that Lukas wasn't standing up for his performance. Jill was the first to sing for her survival in a performance that not only saved her from elimination, but garnered her a standing ovation with her version of Heart's "Alone". Supernova also commented to Patrice that it really is saying something to them if she was in the bottom three even with Tommy playing drums behind her. Before Dana was sent to the bottom three brooke asked who missed their house band rehearsals and it turned out to be Toby and Dana. It turns out that Dana missed the rehearsal because she was at a spa. After Supernova deliberated, Dana was sent home, with the band claiming that she was too young and had a long way to go

Week six 

In The Mansion episode As the ten finalists celebrated their survival in the competition, Gilby arrived on his motorcycle and presented them with new electric guitars from Gibson. Each of the contestants was instructed to write lyrics and perform to one of Supernova's new tracks. All the contestants left Supernova impressed with their presentations. The next day Dilana presented the songs to the other contestants in the dining room. She immediately picked up the song with the opportunity to perform with Gilby Clarke. She asked if anyone else wanted to go for it, however the rockers did not jump at this occasion to shine.

Performance Episode Dilana and Gilby started the show on this night. After their performance, Dave Navarro commented on the fact that no one fought for the chance to perform with Gilby. He went on to proclaim that if it had been up to him, Dilana would have won there and then. Dilana's performance was followed by a stream of great performances by everyone else, such as Magni singing to his family who was flown in for the show, per Supernova's promise. Another noteworthy performance was Zayra performing in a gold unitard and top hat. Magni was again onstage playing guitar for her song selection. This included ending the show with the long anticipated opening up of Lukas' throat, to Jason's delight.

Elimination Episode starting the episode, Supernova announced that all the performances from the night before were outstanding, so instead of just one encore, there would be two. Winning the first encore by a nose, Lukas performed, with his newfound voice, Radiohead's "Creep". The second encore of the night went to Magni, with "The Dolphin's Cry" by Live. Supernova surprised the rockers, announcing the remaining rockers at the end of the show would be going to Las Vegas to see the stage the winner will perform on with Supernova for their New Year's Eve show at the Hard Rock Hotel and Casino. Following the show's format, Brooke announced the rockers who landed in the bottom three at some point during the voting. Those rockers were Jill, Josh, Zayra, Ryan, and Patrice. Dave commented that he was not surprised to see the familiar faces standing as the results were read. Zayra was immediately safe.

The first rocker to end in the final bottom three was Jill who has saved herself in every previous bottom three performance. She performed Aretha Franklin's "Respect" for her elimination review. The second rocker to be in the final three was Josh. Tommy was concerned with Josh being in the bottom three as a result of standing behind his guitar during his performances. In a bold move, Josh announced that he would again be playing his guitar, performing "Shooting Star" by Bad Company. The final rocker to be in the bottom three who would fight for their survival was Ryan, over Patrice, who had never been in the bottom three and had the encore in the previous week. Jason commented he was surprised to see this and maybe the audience was confused with his diversity in performances. For this night, the crowd cheered to his selection of Depeche Mode's "Enjoy the Silence", in which he said he arranged especially for what he thought fit Supernova's taste. Impressed with the changing of his performances and growing momentum, Supernova let Ryan off the hook for this week. In a surprising move, Tommy dropped his axe twice eliminating both Josh and Jill. Both eliminated rockers showed great poise in their final moments and self-proclaimed dork Josh asked if he could still go to Vegas with the rest of the guys (as a joke).

Week seven 

In The Mansion Episode Supernova took the remaining contestants to Las Vegas so they could look at the venue where the eventual winner will debut with the band. Then Supernova threw a party where many of the contestants, most notably Toby and Lukas, get smashed. Once they returned to the mansion to pick songs, Zayra and Ryan discussed who would get the opportunity to perform the "Original Song". Ryan resolved to let Zayra take the opportunity. Meanwhile, Toby literally jumped at the chance to play with Gilby Clarke, after Dilana concedes the song choice to him. She proposed he run around the pool naked for ownership of the Gilby song, which he did without hesitation.

Performance Episode Zayra started the show with her original song. Supernova thought she did amazing and that it was a great performance, but still felt like it was not for Supernova. Most of the rockers received praise from Supernova, however there was one notable bad performance - Storm Large's rendition of Gloria Gaynor's "I Will Survive". It was not well received by the members of Supernova or Dave Navarro. Dave even said he hated the performance, and Tommy Lee remarked that it was "sautéed in 'wrong sauce.'" Patrice also received moderately negative comments, and was told to "bring the rock”. At the end of the show, Dave felt that he spoke too soon, when he told Ryan that his was the best performance and favored Dilana's performance as the best of the night.

Elimination Episode This show introduced the new segment "Special Supernova Performance". Each week, in addition to the "Encore", Supernova will choose a person to sing one of their new songs, with the members of the band. For this first week, they chose Dilana. After the original song, Ryan was awarded the encore, with Jason claiming it as the super dynamic performance for the previous night. The first rocker in the bottom this week was Zayra. She performed an energetic "Razorblade", which was originally performed by Blue October. Supernova noted they had never heard the song before and that both of her performances this week were risky. However, they applauded her for taking these risks. The next rocker in the bottom three was Patrice, singing "Celebrity Skin" by Hole. Patrice attempted to appeal to the band, as Dilana had done in prior weeks, by walking to where Supernova was sitting and sang directly to them. Magni was the last of the bottom three; he chose "Creep" by Radiohead. His song selection was his self-said anthem, as he laid down on the stage and looked toward the "safe" rockers with the line, "I don't belong here". The songs that Patrice and Magni performed were both performed by Lukas Rossi previously. When Supernova was ready to reveal their decision, they sent Magni to the rocker's pod first, exclaiming he was "so far from going home". Ultimately, the choice was to send Zayra home. Zayra explained to the audience, how much of a roller coaster ride this was for her and that we would see her again soon.

Week eight 

In The Mansion Episode The seven remaining contestants were thrown into the grinder when the media came in to interview them. During one of Dilana's interviews, when asked who she hates the most amongst the remaining contestants, she answered Lukas. When Lukas was told how Dilana felt, he responded that he did not need anyone to look after him. Back in the song room, Toby was the one to break the news that two original songs would be performed this week. Ryan felt that since he had to forgo his chance last week, he deserved one. The second original was given to Patrice after Magni said she deserved it for being in the bottom three, for the third time. Notably, Toby allowed Dilana to sing the song he wanted if she would run around the pool naked, like he had to last week. She did, after which Toby stated that he did not even want the song.

Performance Episode Patrice opened the show with her original song, "Beautiful Thing". The song choice prompted an echo of Dave's advice to Zayra a few weeks back: seek a solo career. Magni's rendition of "Smells Like Teen Spirit" met with positive review, as well as Ryan's performance of his original song, "Back of Your Car". Ryan threw his guitar, which was an expensive move, but he was praised for it. Storm's performance of "Cryin'" was also well received, as well as Dilana's performance of "Every Breath You Take", a song that she readily stripped down (at the mansion) to perform. Toby's rendition of "Layla" was heightened when he took off his shirt, a move that Tommy Lee said made the ladies happy. Lukas capped off the night with his performance of "All These Things That I've Done", his only negative comments being centered on facing away from the audience too much. He also received an ambiguous comment from Tommy Lee. Lee said, "Check please", and proceeded to throw down the microphone. This comment has been interpreted by Lukas fans as being a positive, while to others as negative (Check please, being a statement generally signaling one's desire to leave).

Elimination Episode The show began with a recap of some controversial statements made by Dilana, one of which centered on Ryan's performance. Dilana and Ryan were able to voice their opinions on the situation. It was then announced that Toby was Supernova's choice to sing a Supernova song with them this week, and his performance was well received. After that, there was a recap of "Media Day" at the mansion and, again, some of Dilana's responses to the press were perceived as harsh. The band called her on it, and Dilana explained herself, and then apologized. She dismissed it as a mistake, and she said she would learn from it. It was then announced that the Bottom Three was composed of Patrice, Magni, and Toby. Also in the Bottom Three at some point in the voting process was Storm. Magni performed "Fire" by Jimi Hendrix, his second consecutive performance in the Bottom Three. Patrice performed "Middle of the Road" by The Pretenders, her fourth performance in the Bottom Three. Toby performed "Plush" by Stone Temple Pilots, which convinced the band to send him back first. Supernova chose Patrice to be eliminated, explaining that they had to listen to the fans (who had placed her in the Bottom Three for the 4th time). Patrice took the elimination well, stating that this was one of the most amazing experiences in her life. There was no encore this week due to the time taken on the media day discussion.

Week nine

In The Mansion Episode
When the rockers arrived in the mansion, Dilana was still upset by Dave Navarro's words. The next day while she was talking to Lukas and Magni, Dilana became aggravated with herself and her recent performance. In a fit of rage Dilana flipped off the camera, voiced a profanity, and smashed a wine glass to the floor, a piece of glass hit Magni in the head cutting him. The following day was to be a photo shoot with InStyle magazine for the rockers. Storm was a natural in front of the camera, but Magni had the most difficult time posing. Later it was revealed to the rockers that the songs they would be performing this week would be chosen by the fans, some of the rockers saw the fan's selections as fitting while others were troubled by the choices.

Performance Episode
Lukas started the show by singing "Lithium" by Nirvana and was praised by Supernova for his arrangement. Next up was Magni, who has been in the bottom three twice now. He sang "I Alone" by Live and was also praised for his performance, especially by Dave Navarro commenting that "the boy can sing". The fans chose Ryan to sing "Clocks" by Coldplay. He changed the song by rocking it out and also received praise, earning the nickname Ryan "the Darkhorse" Star from Dave Navarro. Storm sang "Bring Me to Life" by Evanescence, with Toby helping on the back-up vocals. However, Gilby thought that her performance was not memorable and cited Jill's version as more memorable. Toby performed "Rebel Yell" by Billy Idol, singing it well, and incorporating crowd interaction by inviting girls from the audience onto the stage.  Last up was Dilana with "Mother Mother" by Tracy Bonham. Dave Navarro said it was the best performance of Rock Star: INXS and Rock Star: Supernova.

Elimination Episode
Supernova started the show with a recap of the performances. Lukas received the special performance and rocked the house. Next up was the encore sung by Toby. Then, the bottom three performances were Ryan who sang "Baba O'Riley" by The Who, Storm who sang "Helter Skelter" by The Beatles, and Dilana who sang "Psycho Killer" by Talking Heads. With Storm and Dilana in the bottom three for the first time, Lukas remained as the only person not to make a Bottom Three Performance. Notably, Dilana forgot the lyrics to her song. Supernova decided it was Ryan who was eliminated, citing the reason that they feel that he may not be the perfect fit for the band.  Supernova, however noted the tremendous progress and improvement that Ryan has made during the duration of his stay in the show and predicted that big things may still happen for his career. In turn, Ryan informed Supernova that they could have made twenty years of great music together and that he would see them on the record charts.

Week ten
In The Mansion Episode
On returning to the mansion, the rockers saluted the departure of Ryan before engaging in a food fight. Afterwards, they listened to the new Supernova track, for which they were all to create melodies and lyrics. The rockers brought their creations and worked with Gilby Clark in a songwriting clinic where everybody received criticism except for Storm and Toby.  When they returned to the mansion, they found out that in addition to performing a cover song at the next performance night, they also had to play an original song.

Performance Episode
Dilana (despite having torn a calf muscle during rehearsals) started the show by singing "Behind Blue Eyes" by The Who followed by her original performance, in which Dave and Tommy had conflicting opinions on. Magni went next and sung the classic "Back in the U.S.S.R." by The Beatles and then went on to sing his original song, which Supernova enjoyed, except Tommy Lee who seemed to think both performances sounded too similar.  Storm continued the show with "Suffragette City" by David Bowie with a surprise guest Dave Navarro on guitar, along with a memorable original song "Ladylike," which Supernova loved - especially Tommy.  Lukas took to the stage next and performed a stripped down version of Bon Jovi's "Livin' on a Prayer" as well as performing his original.  Supernova applauded his performances of both songs on showing his softer side.  To finish the show, Aussie Toby sang the famous hit "Mr. Brightside" by The Killers and an original song that Supernova enjoyed, leading Gilby to mention that Toby brought the fun to rock n' roll.  Overall, the performances were good from all the rockers, as the band had very few criticisms in comparison to other shows. Before the show went off air, the first votes showed Storm, Dilana and Magni in the initial bottom three.

Elimination Episode
The show began by Supernova announcing that Magni would be performing with Supernova this week. Later, Brooke Burke surprised the contenders by saying that this week's encore performer would win one of the brand new Honda Ridgelines the contestants were transported in to the gig. The band announced Toby Rand as the winner by singing his catch phrase "Oh Oh Oh Oh Oh Oh" from his original song "Throw It Away". Toby carried an Australian flag on the way to the stage and told everyone that he is dedicating his encore performance to fellow Aussie the "Crocodile Hunter", Steve Irwin, who had died only days before.  Later on in the night Storm, Dilana, and Lukas were this week's bottom three. Storm sung a rendition of Pink Floyd's "Wish You Were Here," which she dedicated to her mother; during the performance Jason Newsted could be seen wiping a tear drop from his eye (He was crying because of the recent death of his bandmate from VoiVod). Next was Dilana who sang Cheap Trick's "I Want You to Want Me". Lukas closed with his original song "Headspin," which he dedicated, just like Storm, to his mother. After deliberation, the band chose to send Storm home, but on air, Dave Navarro proclaimed that he would like to play with Storm on future projects, Tommy and Jason also volunteered with implication that Gilby would play too.  Dave Navarro lived up to his promise by playing on Storm Large's album Ladylike Side One on the song "Ladylike", which is the same original song she had performed on the show.

Finale week

In The Mansion Episode
During their last few days at the mansion, the four remaining rockers reflected on their time spent at their home away from home.  For song selection, the rockers were presented with over 150 songs to choose from (all but four of them had been performed at some time or the other during the course of the series); three out of four songs selected for performance night were songs that had not been performed, the exception being "Roxanne". The fourth song was "Comfortably Numb" by Pink Floyd.  Lukas and Dilana both wanted the song, but in the end, neither actually kept it. The rockers were instructed by Supernova to perform a song from the list, as well as their original songs.

Performance Episode
As per fans' choice, Ryan Star returned to the show just to perform his hit original song "Back of Your Car" as an opening act. Toby started off with a good performance of "Karma Police" by Radiohead, as well as getting the audience excited with his catchy original, "Throw It Away".  Supernova applauded his performance.  Next up was Lukas, who sang "Fix You" by Coldplay and a stripped down version of his original, "Headspin".  Dilana went next with the song "Roxanne" by The Police.  Like all the rest, she then sang her original, "Supersoul", which Supernova enjoyed.  Magni finished the show with the Deep Purple song "Hush" followed by his original, "When the Time Comes".  However, unlike the other rockers, Tommy Lee and Jason Newsted had criticisms for Magni's performances, particularly how his original is not as "memorable" as some of the others.  Nevertheless, Gilby Clark stated that he enjoyed both songs.

Elimination Episode
At the beginning of the show, Magni and Toby were revealed to be in the bottom two. Both of them performed songs that they had done prior. Magni performed 'Fire' and Toby performed 'White Wedding'. Based on these performances, Supernova sent Magni home saying he was more like someone part of a band instead of a frontman. The three remaining rockers then each performed a song they felt best represented themselves. Lukas sang 'Bittersweet Symphony', Dilana performed 'Zombie' and Toby performed 'Somebody Told Me'. Based on these performances, the band sent Toby home. After further deliberation,  Lukas won and became the frontman for Supernova, which meant that for the second straight season, the winner of Rock Star is a Canadian. Dilana was offered to have her album written and produced by Gilby Clarke. Dave Navarro offered to play on the album.

After the announcement that Lukas had been chosen to front the band, the newly formed Supernova closed the show with a performance of "'Be Yourself (And Five Other Clichés)" and "It's All Love" (originally performed with Supernova by Toby and Magni, respectively).

Elimination chart

Album
Following the series Rock Star Supernova recorded and released their self-titled debut album Rock Star Supernova with the first single being released in September 2006. The album charted at #101 on the Billboard 200 and #4 on the Canadian Albums Chart and was certified Platinum in Canada (over 100,000 units sold). Supernova's first concert performance took place on New Year's Eve at The Joint at the Hard Rock Hotel and Casino in Las Vegas, Nevada. A world tour followed in early 2007.

House band
Five musicians made up the house band that backed the 15 contestants during the show. The house band was made up of Paul Mirkovich, Jim McGorman, Nate Morton, Sasha Krivtsov, and Rafael Moreira.  Several of these musicians currently perform as the house band for the NBC show The Voice.

References

External links
 
 
 Contestant List
 Rock Star: Supernova on Reality Thumbnails

2000s American reality television series
2006 American television series debuts
2006 American television series endings
CBS original programming
Singing talent shows